Fabricio Coloccini (born 22 January 1982) is an Argentine former professional footballer who played as a centre-back.

Coloccini began his club career at Boca Juniors in his native Argentina attracting the attention of A.C. Milan. He failed to establish himself there and was loaned to four clubs. After making his reputation at Deportivo La Coruña he joined Newcastle United in August 2008 and, in July 2011, was promoted to club captain. In April 2012 he was named in the PFA Team of the Year. On 5 July 2016, Coloccini returned to Argentina to join San Lorenzo, with whom he had previously been on loan.

At international level, Coloccini represented Argentina on 39 occasions between 2003–2014, scoring one goal, and was a member of the teams that reached the finals of the 2004 Copa América and the 2005 FIFA Confederations Cup; he also took part at the 2006 FIFA World Cup. At youth level, he was a member of the sides that won 2001 FIFA World Youth Championship, and the gold medal at the 2004 Olympics.

On April 1st, 2022, Coloccini was announced as the new Venezuela U-20 manager.

Club career

Boca Juniors
Born in Córdoba, Córdoba Province, Coloccini started his career in the youth team of Argentinos Juniors, but made his professional debut in 1998 with Boca Juniors. He made one league appearance, as a starting line-up, in his one and only season with Boca. He played in Walter Samuel's position, who received a call-up from the Argentina national team. Coloccini scored in his only match, leveling the scores in a 2–2 draw with Unión de Santa Fé.

A.C. Milan
In 1999, at the end of the Apertura championship, Coloccini moved to A.C. Milan. He was at the centre of a controversy between Boca and Milan, because the transfer from Argentina to Italy was not agreed between the clubs. Instead, Milan arranged terms with Coloccini's father (also a former football player), who exercised his parental rights to remove the minor from Argentina. After that, FIFA ordered Milan to pay Boca compensation.

Loan moves
In 2000, Coloccini was loaned to San Lorenzo where he helped the team to win the 2001 Clausura tournament. From 2001–04, Coloccini served three consecutive loans in La Liga: Alavés (netting six league goals), Atlético Madrid, and Villarreal, where he was always first-choice.

Deportivo La Coruña
After having only appeared once for A.C. Milan officially, Coloccini joined Deportivo La Coruña in January 2005, on a six-year deal. During his three-and-a-half seasons stint, he was an undisputed starter, and appeared in all the matches during 2007–08 netting four goals, good enough for a UEFA Intertoto Cup berth for the club.

Newcastle United

Coloccini joined Newcastle United on a five-year contract in August 2008 for a fee of up to £10.3 million. Two days later, he made his debut against the reigning league champions, Manchester United, playing 90 minutes in a 1–1 away draw.

Since his debut, Coloccini was one of the most consistent inclusions in Newcastle's squad, and formed a partnership with fellow newcomer Sébastien Bassong in his first season. He was not immune to the pressures of representing Newcastle's infamous defence, coming under his most intense criticism for his performance in Newcastle's 5–1 defeat to Liverpool. Despite his mistakes in the game, manager Joe Kinnear voiced his support for Coloccini, stating that he believed his "Mr. Reliable" would bounce back. On 1 February, Coloccini was substituted against Sunderland in the 93rd minute. Up until this point, he had played every minute of every game for Newcastle all season. He was dropped for the 1–1 draw with Stoke City, but played in Newcastle's 1–0 defeat to Aston Villa, which saw them relegated.

Despite Newcastle's relegation, Coloccini stayed on and was the mainstay of the club's defence all season, partnering the likes of Steven Taylor, Mike Williamson, Fitz Hall and Tamás Kádár in the sturdiest rearguard of the championship. He scored two goals for Newcastle since relegation, a header at Cardiff City, and another header at Watford. The club was eventually promoted back to the Premier League as champions, and Coloccini's great contributions awarded him a place in the Championship's Team of the Year. Coloccini scored his third Newcastle goal against Wigan Athletic in the fourth minute of injury time as they came from two goals down to draw 2–2 at St James' Park, with that being his first goal in the Premier League on the same day that he captained Newcastle for the first time. Coloccini scored a striker's finish in a 1–1 draw with Tottenham Hotspur on 22 January 2011, the day of his 29th birthday and his 100th Newcastle appearance.

He continued his fine form for Newcastle into April, reforming his partnership with Mike Williamson after a brief time with Steven Taylor in January. On 2 April, Coloccini made numerous forward runs and forward roaming to help supply Peter Løvenkrands' goal in the 4–1 win over Wolves. Manager Alan Pardew, along with pundit Jamie Redknapp complimented the defender for his contributions to the team's attack, calling him a "top, top player".

On 8 July 2011, Coloccini was named Newcastle captain for the 2011–12 season. He and Taylor rekindled their partnership and were central to one of the Premier League's meanest defences, conceding a mere eight goals in the first 11 games. He scored his first goal of the season in the 122nd minute to win the game against Championship club Nottingham Forest in a 4–3 thriller in the third round of the League Cup that saw Forest equalise on three occasions. In October, he was selected for the North East Football Writers' Association Player of the Year for 2011. On 22 April 2012, Coloccini was named in the PFA Team of the Year. After an impressive display in the Tyne–Wear derby against Sunderland in October, Pardew was so impressed with the way Coloccini played that he said the performance was just like watching England legend Bobby Moore.

In January 2013, Coloccini stunned Newcastle by asking for a transfer back to Argentina citing personal reasons. His preference was to move to the team he helped win the 2001 Clausura, San Lorenzo. However, San Lorenzo could not afford his wages or the transfer fee Newcastle would want, as he still had four years left on his contract. After lengthy talks with club officials and manager Alan Pardew, Coloccini decided to stay at St James' Park until the end of the 2012–13 season and then decide on where his future lies. On 16 June 2013, Coloccini confirmed that he was staying at Newcastle until the end of the 2013–14 season at least, after lengthy talks with Pardew. Coloccini also praised Newcastle as a club, saying that they had done everything possible to make him stay. On 1 November 2014, Coloccini made his 200th league appearance for Newcastle, in the 1–0 win over Liverpool at St James' Park. Eight days later, he scored his first goal in three years, with a header in Newcastle's 2–0 away win over West Bromwich Albion.

In July 2015, Coloccini was linked with a move to Crystal Palace to link up with former manager Alan Pardew on a permanent deal. This was later publicly dismissed by Pardew, in a statement released on 5 August 2015. On 6 August, Coloccini ended speculation about his future by penning a one-year contract extension until the end of the 2016–17 season, with the option of a further year beyond that.

San Lorenzo
On 5 July 2016, Coloccini mutually agreed with Newcastle that his contract would be terminated, with him signing for Primera División side San Lorenzo that same day.

International career
Coloccini was part of the Argentina Under-20 that won the 2001 FIFA World Youth Championship, as well as the gold medal winning Argentina team at the 2004 Summer Olympics.

With the Argentine senior squad, he made his international debut on 30 April 2003, in a 3–1 friendly win over Libya, in Tripoli. The following year, he was a member of the team that reached the final of the 2004 Copa América, only to lose to Brazil 4–2 on penalties, following a 2–2 draw. He scored his only international goal on 4 September 2004, in a 3–1 away win over Peru, in Lima, in a 2006 FIFA World Cup qualifier. He later participated in the 2005 Confederations Cup, where Argentina once again finished as runners-up to Brazil following a 4–1 defeat in the final.

At the 2006 FIFA World Cup, Coloccini played in two games, as a substitute against the Netherlands, and starting against hosts Germany in the quarter-finals, which ended in a 5–3 penalty shootout loss following a 1–1 draw. Coloccini was an unused substitute in Argentina's World Cup qualifier against Brazil on 6 September 2009. He was absent from the national team in the 2010 FIFA World Cup. Due to his great form throughout 2012, Coloccini was recalled to the Argentina squad under new manager Alejandro Sabella for the FIFA World Cup qualifiers against Paraguay and Peru in September 2012. Coloccini played the full 90 minutes in a 5–2 win over Paraguay on 10 September, a game which sealed Argentina's place in the 2014 FIFA World Cup in Brazil.

Style of play
As a defender, Coloccini was known for his physical strength, consistency, experience, fearless challenges, stamina, and in particular, his ability in the air, which made him a goal-threat from set-pieces in the opposing penalty area. Although he normally played as a centre-back, he was also deployed as a right-back on occasion. Regarded as a promising defender in his youth, he was named one of the 100 best young footballers in the world by Don Balón in 2001.

Career statistics

Club

International

Scores and results list Argentina's goal tally first, score column indicates score after each Coloccini goal.

Honours
Boca Juniors
 Primera División: Apertura 1998, Clausura 1999

San Lorenzo
 Primera División: Clausura 2001

Villarreal
 UEFA Intertoto Cup: 2003

Newcastle United
 Football League Championship: 2009–10

Argentina U20
 FIFA World Youth Championship: 2001

Argentina U23
 Olympic Gold Medal: 2004

Individual
 PFA Team of the Year: 2009–10 Championship, 2011–12 Premier League
North-East FWA Player of the Year: 2011

References

External links

1982 births
Argentine people of Italian descent
Footballers from Córdoba, Argentina
Living people
Association football defenders
Argentine footballers
Argentina international footballers
Argentina under-20 international footballers
Argentine expatriate footballers
Expatriate footballers in Italy
Expatriate footballers in Spain
Expatriate footballers in England
Argentinos Juniors footballers
Boca Juniors footballers
San Lorenzo de Almagro footballers
A.C. Milan players
Deportivo Alavés players
Atlético Madrid footballers
Villarreal CF players
Deportivo de La Coruña players
Argentine Primera División players
Serie A players
La Liga players
Premier League players
English Football League players
Newcastle United F.C. players
2004 Copa América players
2005 FIFA Confederations Cup players
2006 FIFA World Cup players
Olympic footballers of Argentina
Olympic gold medalists for Argentina
Footballers at the 2004 Summer Olympics
Citizens of Italy through descent
Italian sportspeople of Argentine descent
Argentine expatriate sportspeople in Italy
Argentine expatriate sportspeople in Spain
Argentine expatriate sportspeople in England
Olympic medalists in football
Medalists at the 2004 Summer Olympics